, or , is a 2009 Japanese novel by Natsumi Iwasaki. It follows high school girl Minami Kawashima who manages her school's baseball team using Peter Drucker's Management: Tasks, Responsibilities, Practices to rally her dispirited teammates. A 10-episode anime television series by Production I.G aired between April and May 2011. A live-action movie was released in Japan on June 4, 2011.

Plot 
The story follows Minami Kawashima who, as a favor to her childhood friend, Yuki Miyata, takes over as manager for the Hodokubo High School Baseball team when Yuki is hospitalized with an illness. With no previous experience managing a team, Minami ends up picking up a copy of Peter Drucker's business management book, Management: Tasks, Responsibilities, Practices, and starts to manage the baseball team like one would manage a business, with the goal of reaching the nationals.

Characters 

Minami is a high school kid who hates baseball, having had her dreams of becoming a professional baseball player shattered at a young age. When her best friend, Yuki, is hospitalized with an illness, Minami takes her place as manager for a high school baseball team, using Peter Drucker's Management as a reference point.

Minami's best friend who has been with her since they were babies. She has had a condition since when she was little and had become hospitalized after becoming the manager of the baseball team. She joined the team having been impressed seeing Minami play baseball as a kid, and dreams of taking her team to the nationals. However, just as the team reach the finals of the prefectural tournament, she succumbs to her terminal illness and passes away.

The coach of the Hodokubo Baseball Team. While his orders are sometimes harsh, he always has the team's safety in mind. After Minami informs him about innovation, he concocts the 'no-bunt, no-ball' strategy, hoping to revolutionize high school baseball.

The team's main pitcher. He is often determined to show his worth on the field, though his play tends to weaken after making 100 pitches.

The team's catcher, who is also one of Minami's childhood friends.

The team's score keeper and part of the management team. She is incredibly shy, usually saying little else besides "Oh, yeah, right," and has a strong admiration for Yuki.

Initially the team's captain, though prior to the prefectural tournament he steps down from this position to focus on his plays.

One of the team members who joins the management team and is later made the team's captain after Jun steps down.

The team's pinch runner. He is a fast athlete, often occasionally training with the track club.

The team's shortstop. He is rather timid and often makes mistakes under pressure.

He's the team's secondary pitcher. He often lacks physical strength.

Hanae is a friend of Yūnosuke's who tries to support him when he's down. She later joins the management team, wanting to make something of herself.

Media

Novel 
The original novel, written by Natsumi Iwasaki with illustrations by Yukiusagi and Bamboo, was published by Diamondosha and released in Japan on December 4, 2009. The novel sold 1.81 million copies during its first year and became the year's bestselling novel in Japan.

Manga 
A manga adaptation was launched in Shueisha's seinen manga magazine Super Jump on December 22, 2010. After Super Jump ceased publication in 2011, the manga was transferred to Grand Jump Premium on December 21, 2011. The most recent chapter of the series was published in the magazine's October 2012 issue, published on September 26. The series has been suspended since then. Shueisha compiled the series into three tankōbon volumes, released from May 2, 2011

Anime 
In October 2010, the Japanese public broadcaster NHK announced that a 10-episode anime television series based on the novel would begin airing on its network starting in March 2011. Due to the 2011 Tōhoku earthquake and tsunami, the series was delayed from its original airdate and aired between April 25, 2011, and May 6, 2011, instead. Aimed at men and women in their 30s and 40s, the anime series is produced by Production I.G under the direction of Takayuki Hamana. The series' screenplay is by Jun'ichi Fujisaku while Jun Sato composes the music. The opening theme is  performed by azusa and the closing theme is  performed by momo.

Episode list

Live-action film 

A film adaption starring actress Atsuko Maeda as the lead role of Minami Kawashima was released in Japanese theatres on June 4, 2011. Over 30 companies bid for the novel's film rights. It debuted on the 4th position in the Japanese box office with a total gross of US$2,232,675 on its debut weekend. The original soundtrack was released by Sony Music Entertainment on June 1, 2011.

References

External links 
  
 Moshidora at NHK 
 Moshidora tv at NHK 
 

Moshidora
2009 Japanese novels
2011 Japanese television series debuts
2011 Japanese television series endings
2011 manga
Anime and manga based on novels
Baseball in anime and manga
Baseball novels
Japanese novels adapted into films
NHK original programming
Production I.G
Seinen manga
Shueisha franchises
Shueisha manga